Limnes is a traditional Cretan small village in Lasithi, Crete, Greece, located 10 km from Agios Nikolaos. It is surrounded by olive trees and mountains.

References 

Populated places in Lasithi